Francis William Weldon MVO MBE MC (2 August 1913 – 21 September 1993) was a British equestrian and Olympic champion. He won a team gold medal in eventing at the 1956 Summer Olympics in Stockholm, and received an individual bronze medal. He became European champion in 1953, 1954 and 1955.

Weldon was a lieutenant colonel in the British Army and was Officer Commanding, the King's Troop, Royal Horse Artillery.

References

External links
 

1913 births
1993 deaths
Royal Horse Artillery officers
Olympic equestrians of Great Britain
British male equestrians
Equestrians at the 1956 Summer Olympics
Equestrians at the 1960 Summer Olympics
Olympic gold medallists for Great Britain
Olympic bronze medallists for Great Britain
British event riders
Recipients of the Military Cross
Olympic medalists in equestrian
Medalists at the 1956 Summer Olympics
Members of the Order of the British Empire
20th-century British Army personnel